Explained is an American documentary television series on the streaming service Netflix. The show is produced by Vox Media and is based on Vox's previous YouTube video series which followed a similar format. The show's episodes averaged between 16 and 24 minutes, with each focusing on a different topic. Each episode is voiced by a different guest narrator. The series premiered on Netflix on May 23, 2018 with episodes released on a weekly basis. The second season premiered on September 26, 2019 and the third season on July 16, 2021. 

The show has also spawned five spin-off series. On September 12, 2019, Netflix released the first season of The Mind, Explained, a series focused specifically on topics related to the human brain. On January 4, 2020, a follow-up titled Sex, Explained was released, with episodes centered around the theme of sex. On April 26, 2020, the 3-episode miniseries Coronavirus, Explained was released, which focuses on the COVID-19 pandemic. On September 28, 2020, the 3-episode miniseries, Whose Vote Counts, Explained was released, which  details this history and current context of voting in the United States. Money, Explained, a 5-episode miniseries released on May 11, 2021, focused on financial scams, credit cards, student loans, retirement and gambling. On November 9, 2021, a   second season of The Mind, Explained was released.

Episodes

Series overview

Season 1 (2018)

Season 2 (2019)

Season 3 (2021)

Reception 
The first season of Explained received generally positive reviews from critics. Kahron Spearman of The Daily Dot praised the show's use of "experts, easy-to-understand charting, and linear storytelling". In his review for IndieWire, Steve Greene wrote that the show "manages to avoid patronizing that unpredictable audience, presenting historical timelines and abstract concepts in a way that viewers can choose to digest however they wish".

References

External links
  on Netflix
 

2018 American television series debuts
2010s American documentary television series
2020s American documentary television series
English-language Netflix original programming
Netflix original documentary television series
Vox Media